Oecanthus capensis, the Cape thermometer cricket, is a species of tree cricket (Subfamily Oecanthinae). It has been found that the rate at which these crickets chirp follows Dolbear's law.

Description
Similar to Oecanthus pellucens, but a little smaller; the wings shorter, elytra of the female slightly stronger, male elytra shorter. The female's ovipositor is nearly the length of elytra.

Range
Southern, eastern and central South Africa.

Habitat

Ecology

Etymology
Cape; capensis - after the Cape of Good Hope.
Thermometer cricket - The rate at which these crickets chirp can be used to the estimate the temperature.

Taxonomy

References

Insects described in 1878
capensis